Jamesbrittenia is a genus of flowering plants in the family Scrophulariaceae, disjunctly distributed in southern Africa, Sudan and Egypt, and India and Bangladesh. Subshrubs with profuse flowering, they are amenable to containers, so a number of cultivars and hybrid cultivars have been developed for the garden trade.

Species
Currently accepted species include:

Jamesbrittenia accrescens (Hiern) Hilliard
Jamesbrittenia acutiloba (Pilg.) Hilliard
Jamesbrittenia adpressa (Dinter) Hilliard
Jamesbrittenia albanensis Hilliard
Jamesbrittenia albiflora (I.Verd.) Hilliard
Jamesbrittenia albobadia Hilliard
Jamesbrittenia albomarginata Hilliard
Jamesbrittenia amplexicaulis (Benth.) Hilliard
Jamesbrittenia angolensis Hilliard
Jamesbrittenia argentea (L.f.) Hilliard
Jamesbrittenia aridicola Hilliard
Jamesbrittenia aspalathoides (Benth.) Hilliard
Jamesbrittenia aspleniifolia Hilliard
Jamesbrittenia atropurpurea (Benth.) Hilliard
Jamesbrittenia aurantiaca (Burch.) Hilliard
Jamesbrittenia barbata Hilliard
Jamesbrittenia bergae Lemmer
Jamesbrittenia beverlyana (Hilliard & B.L.Burtt) Hilliard
Jamesbrittenia bicolor (Dinter) Hilliard
Jamesbrittenia breviflora (Schltr.) Hilliard
Jamesbrittenia burkeana (Benth.) Hilliard
Jamesbrittenia calciphila Hilliard
Jamesbrittenia candida Hilliard
Jamesbrittenia canescens (Benth.) Hilliard
Jamesbrittenia carvalhoi (Engl.) Hilliard
Jamesbrittenia chenopodioides Hilliard
Jamesbrittenia concinna (Hiern) Hilliard
Jamesbrittenia crassicaulis (Benth.) Hilliard
Jamesbrittenia dentatisepala (Overkott) Hilliard
Jamesbrittenia dissecta (Delile) Kuntze
Jamesbrittenia dolomitica Hilliard
Jamesbrittenia elegantissima (Schinz) Hilliard
Jamesbrittenia filicaulis (Benth.) Hilliard
Jamesbrittenia fimbriata Hilliard
Jamesbrittenia fleckii (Thell.) Hilliard
Jamesbrittenia fodina (Wild) Hilliard
Jamesbrittenia foliolosa (Benth.) Hilliard
Jamesbrittenia fragilis (Pilg.) Hilliard
Jamesbrittenia fruticosa (Benth.) Hilliard
Jamesbrittenia giessii Hilliard
Jamesbrittenia glutinosa (Benth.) Hilliard
Jamesbrittenia grandiflora (Galpin) Hilliard
Jamesbrittenia hereroensis (Engl.) Hilliard
Jamesbrittenia heucherifolia (Diels) Hilliard
Jamesbrittenia huillana (Diels) Hilliard
Jamesbrittenia incisa (Thunb.) Hilliard
Jamesbrittenia integerrima (Benth.) Hilliard
Jamesbrittenia jurassica (Hilliard & B.L.Burtt) Hilliard
Jamesbrittenia kraussiana (Bernh.) Hilliard
Jamesbrittenia lesutica Hilliard
Jamesbrittenia lyperioides (Engl.) Hilliard
Jamesbrittenia macrantha (Codd) Hilliard
Jamesbrittenia major (Pilg.) Hilliard
Jamesbrittenia maritima (Hiern) Hilliard
Jamesbrittenia maxii (Hiern) Hilliard
Jamesbrittenia megadenia Hilliard
Jamesbrittenia megaphylla Hilliard
Jamesbrittenia merxmuelleri (Roessler) Hilliard
Jamesbrittenia micrantha (Klotzsch) Hilliard
Jamesbrittenia microphylla (L.f.) Hilliard
Jamesbrittenia montana (Diels) Hilliard
Jamesbrittenia multisecta Hilliard
Jamesbrittenia myriantha Hilliard
Jamesbrittenia namaquensis Hilliard
Jamesbrittenia pallida (Pilg.) Hilliard
Jamesbrittenia pedunculosa (Benth.) Hilliard
Jamesbrittenia phlogiflora (Benth.) Hilliard
Jamesbrittenia pilgeriana (Dinter) Hilliard
Jamesbrittenia pinnatifida (L.f.) Hilliard
Jamesbrittenia primuliflora (Thell.) Hilliard
Jamesbrittenia pristisepala (Hiern) Hilliard
Jamesbrittenia racemosa (Benth.) Hilliard
Jamesbrittenia ramosissima (Hiern) Hilliard
Jamesbrittenia sessilifolia (Diels) Hilliard
Jamesbrittenia silenoides (Hilliard) Hilliard
Jamesbrittenia stellata Hilliard
Jamesbrittenia stricta (Benth.) Hilliard
Jamesbrittenia tenella (Hiern) Hilliard
Jamesbrittenia tenuifolia (Bernh.) Hilliard
Jamesbrittenia thunbergii (G.Don) Hilliard
Jamesbrittenia tortuosa (Benth.) Hilliard
Jamesbrittenia tysonii (Hiern) Hilliard
Jamesbrittenia zambesica (R.E.Fr.) Hilliard
Jamesbrittenia zuurbergensis Hilliard

References

 
Scrophulariaceae
Scrophulariaceae genera